was a Japanese professional sumo wrestler from Yamagata Prefecture. He was the sport's 47th yokozuna, fighting at the sport's highest rank from 1961 to 1969. After his retirement he became an elder of the Japan Sumo Association and ran his own training stable from 1970 until his death.

Career

Born  in what is now part of the city of Tsuruoka in the northern prefecture of Yamagata, he made his professional debut in September 1954, joining Isenoumi stable. He initially fought under his real name and rose rapidly up the rankings, reaching the top makuuchi division in September 1958. In only his fourth top division tournament, coinciding with his adoption of the shikona surname Kashiwado, he was runner-up to yokozuna Tochinishiki with a 13–2 record and earned special prizes for Fighting Spirit and Technique. He made the sanyaku ranks in November 1959, earning promotion to ōzeki in September 1960 and taking his first top division yūshō or championship in January 1961. After taking part in a playoff for the championship in September of that year, he was promoted to yokozuna, joining the aging pair of Asashio and Wakanohana who were soon to retire.

He went on to win five top division championships in total, a long way behind the thirty-two captured by his rival Taihō, who was promoted to yokozuna simultaneously with him. He was however a tournament runner-up on no fewer than fifteen occasions. Kashiwado suffered from many injury problems during his career, which led to him being dubbed the "glass yokozuna". He failed to complete four tournaments in a row from January to July 1963. However he made a spectacular comeback in September 1963, winning his first championship as a yokozuna with a perfect 15–0 record. He was listed as a yokozuna on the banzuke for 47 tournaments, which puts him in equal seventh place on the all-time list. He was popular among sumo crowds, appealing to those who found Taihō too dominant. The eight years in which the two shared the yokozuna rank was known as the Hakuhō era, a combination of their names (Haku is another reading of Kashi.) Their head-to-head record was fairly even, standing at 18-16 in Taihō's favour by May 1967, before Taihō won their last five matches in a row as Kashiwado began to fade.

Fighting style
Kashiwado's favoured kimarite or techniques were migi-yotsu (a left hand outside, right hand inside grip on the opponents mawashi), yorikiri (force out) and tsukidashi (thrust out). In all, about sixty percent of his wins were by either force out or force out and down (yoritaoshi).

Retirement from sumo
After retiring from active competition in July 1969 Kashiwado remained in the sumo world as an elder, and he opened up his own stable, Kagamiyama, in November 1970. In July 1975 he oversaw the simultaneous promotion of Zaonishiki and Konuma to jūryō. He coached Tagaryū to the sekiwake rank, and a top division championship in September 1984. He also served as a director of the Sumo Association and was head of the judges committee until 1994. He died of liver failure in 1996, at the age of 58. Taihō was at Kashiwado's bedside and was distraught over his death. The former Tagaryū took over the running of Kagamiyama stable, which still exists as of 2020, but with only two wrestlers.

Career record
The Kyushu tournament was first held in 1957, and the Nagoya tournament in 1958.

See also
Glossary of sumo terms
List of past sumo wrestlers
List of sumo tournament top division champions
List of sumo tournament top division runners-up
List of sumo tournament second division champions
List of yokozuna

References

External links

 Japan Sumo Association profile

1938 births
1996 deaths
Japanese sumo wrestlers
Yokozuna
Sumo people from Yamagata Prefecture